Sparkle - the national transgender charity based in the United Kingdom that is best known for organising the annual Sparkle Weekend in Manchester, which aims to celebrate the transgender community. The event claims to be the world's largest transgender event.

History 
Sparkle was formed in 2005 by Kimberly Nolan and was granted registered charity status in 2011 by board member Sophie Summers.

Sparkle Weekend 
Sparkle Weekend occurs in the second weekend every July, with the 12th weekend celebrated in 2016., where over 12,000 people attended It is based around Manchester's Canal Street, with local bars and restaurants sponsoring and advertising the event, and various talks and workshops are run. On the Saturday and Sunday, Sackville Gardens hosts a stage and stalls.

Transgender Day of Remembrance (TDoR) 
Sparkle also hosts the Manchester Transgender Day of Remembrance every November on the Sunday nearest to the 20th to remember victims of transphobic crime as part of the Transgender Day of Remembrance.

Other activities 
In addition to organising the Sparkle Weekend, the charity aims to promote awareness and acceptance of the Transgender community. In November 2014, Sparkle organised a candle-lit vigil to remember victims of transphobic crime as part of the Transgender Day of Remembrance.

Trustees and Patrons 
Sparkle has a governing body of trustees who are led by Joanne Mason (Chair) and Lee Clatworthy (Interim Vice Chair). Sparkle currently has three patrons Professor Stephen Whittle OBE, LGBT Rights Activist Rebecca Fox, and Actress Annie Wallace.

See also 

 List of transgender-related topics
 List of transgender-rights organizations
 Transgender Day of Remembrance
 Transgenderism
 Transphobia

References

External links
 Sparkle

LGBT organisations in the United Kingdom
LGBT culture in Manchester